Macek is a surname. Notable people with the name include:

 Bernhard A. Macek (born 1975), Austrian historian
 Brooks Macek (born 1992), Canadian-German ice hockey player
 Carl Macek (1951–2010), American writer and anime pioneer
 Don Macek (born 1954), American football player
 Michal Macek (born 1981), Czech footballer
 Miroslav Macek (born 1944), politician and former deputy prime minister of the Czech Republic
 Roman Macek (born 1997), Czech football player

See also
 Maček
 Mašek

Czech-language surnames